KE, ke, and variations may refer to:

Language
 Ke (kana), the romanisation of the Japanese kana け and ケ
 Small ke (ヶ), a Japanese character, a small form of ke (ケ)

People
 Ke (surname) (kē, 柯), a transliteration of a common Chinese surname
 Ké, stage name of New York  singer/songwriter/actor Kevin Grivois

Places
 Kenya (ISO 3166 code KE)
 County Kildare, Ireland
 Košice, Slovakia

Science and technology

Biology and medicine
 In toxicology, a Key Event or KE is an element in a chain of biological events (or adverse outcome pathway) that eventually leads to adverse effects.
 KE family, medical name for a family of Pakistani origin exhibiting a severe speech disorder
 Kinetic energy penetrator or KE penetrator, a type of ammunition designed to penetrate vehicle armour 
 Elimination rate constant, a value used in pharmacokinetics to calculate the rate at which drugs are removed from the system
 The Chinese name of Lithocarpus glaber, the Japanese oak, a tree species

Computing and the internet
 .ke, internet top-level domain for Kenya
 Knowledge engineering, in computer science and in cognitive science

Physics
 Coulomb constant (ke), in physics
 Kinetic energy, in physics

Other uses
 Ke (unit), a traditional Chinese unit of decimal time lasting either 14.4 minutes or 15 minutes
 Korean Air (IATA airline designator KE)
Operation Ke, the successful Japanese withdrawal from Guadalcanal in the Second World War
 KE Adventure Travel LTD is a worldwide tour operator based in Keswick, United Kingdom.